The men's 200 metres event at the 1967 Summer Universiade was held at the National Olympic Stadium in Tokyo on 2 and 3 September 1967.

Medalists

Results

Heats

Semifinals

Final

Wind: -1.1 m/s

References

Athletics at the 1967 Summer Universiade
1967